The Shattered Helmet is Volume 52 in the original The Hardy Boys Mystery Stories published by Grosset & Dunlap.

This book was written for the Stratemeyer Syndicate by Andrew E. Svenson in 1973.

Plot summary
Danger is the name of the game when the Hardys agree to help their pen pal from Greece, Evangelos Pandropolos,  search for a priceless, ancient Greek helmet. Years ago, Evan's uncle had loaned it to a Hollywood movie company for use in a silent motion picture, The Persian Glory, for a role in the movie, but the treasured helmet was lost after the movie was done.

At Hunt College, where Evan, Frank, Joe and Chet Morton are taking a summer course in film-making, the boys are harassed by Leon Saffel whose harassments get more and more vicious. All the while a gang is trying to force Mr. Hardy to give up his investigations of a national crime syndicate and also trying to find the helmet, which after speaking to Evan's billionaire uncle, they learn may have belonged to King Agamemnon, making the helmet even more valuable.

The clues that the Hardys unearth keep them constantly on the move—from their college campus to California and finally to Greece. In a sizzling climax, the Hardys, Evan and Chet match wits with their powerful enemies on the island of Corfu.

References

The Hardy Boys books
1973 American novels
1973 children's books
Novels set in California
Novels set in Greece
Grosset & Dunlap books